The Ernie Game is a 1967 Canadian drama film directed by Don Owen.

Plot
The film centres on Ernie Turner and his attempts to survive in the world after he's released from an asylum. He grows increasingly alienated and his fragile mental state declines, moving between two women, ex-girlfriend and current lover.

Cast
 Alexis Kanner as Ernie Turner
 Jackie Burroughs as Gail
 Anna Cameron as Social worker
 Leonard Cohen as Singer
 Corinne Copnick as Landlady
 Rolland D'Amour as Neighbour
 Judith Gault as Donna
 Derek May as Ernie's accomplice
 Louis Negin as Ernie's friend

Production
The Ernie Game was directed and written by Don Owen, and was shot by Martin Duckworth and Jean-Claude Labrecque using 35 mm film. Kensington Market and Leonard Cohen did the soundtrack for the movie. Owen wrote the script based on material written by Bernard Cole Spencer.

The film, a co-production between the National Film Board of Canada and Canadian Broadcasting Corporation, was filmed in Montreal from 16 January to 1 April 1967. Owen claimed that he had to fight with the NFB in order for the movie to be made and this was the last film he made for the NFB. It was completed with a budget of $320,561, after initially being budgeted at $265,621.

Release

The movie aired on CBC Television on 8 November 1967, and was theatrically distributed by Columbia Pictures for two weeks starting on 17 October 1968. The movie was a commercial failure. Delays by Kensington Market while writing the score, which was completed two weeks before its television premiere, prevented it from appearing at the New York Film Festival and Montreal International Film Festival.

Reception
Maclean's stated that the film was the "best fiction movie Canada ever made" and Variety stated that it was the "best Canadian feature film made to date". However, Gerald Pratley of the Toronto Telegram stated that it was "an utter failure" and Patrick Scott of the Toronto Star stated that it was "the largest pile of garbage committed to film since the invention of the nickelodeon". Senator Edgar Fournier opposed The Ernie Game and Waiting for Caroline for being "indecent, immoral and repulsive" and both going overbudget. It was called "One of the most innovative examples of personal cinema to come from English Canada in the Sixties" by the Cinematheque Ontario.

It was shown at the 18th Berlin International Film Festival and screened in the Director's Fortnight stream at the 1969 Cannes Film Festival.

Accolades

References

Works cited

External links
The Ernie Game at the National Film Board of Canada

1967 films
1967 drama films
Canadian drama films
English-language Canadian films
Films directed by Don Owen
National Film Board of Canada films
Best Picture Genie and Canadian Screen Award winners
Films shot in Montreal
Films set in Montreal
Films about mental health
Leonard Cohen
1960s English-language films
1960s Canadian films